La calandria is a 1972 Italian comedy film directed by Pasquale Festa Campanile. It is based upon the Renaissance play La calandria by Bernardo Dovizi, itself based on Plautus' Menaechmi and Giovanni Boccaccio's Decameron.

Plot 
The luxurious Livio (Lando Buzzanca) bets with the lord of the city to seduce a young bride (Agostina Belli) in a month, at the cost of his genitals.

Cast 
Lando Buzzanca: Lidio
Barbara Bouchet: Lucrezia
Agostina Belli: Fulvia
Salvo Randone: Calandro
Mario Scaccia: Ruffo
Giusi Raspani Dandolo: madre di Calandro
Cesare Gelli: Ferruccio Consagra
Maria Grazia Spina: Clizia, la cameriera
Roberto Antonelli: Tessenio 
Giuliana Calandra
Clara Colosimo
Toni Ucci

See also        
 List of Italian films of 1972

References

External links

1972 films
Italian historical comedy films
1972 comedy films
Films directed by Pasquale Festa Campanile
Films based on works by Giovanni Boccaccio
Films based on works by Plautus
Works based on Menaechmi
1970s Italian-language films
1970s Italian films